Maastricht Aachen Airport  is a regional airport in Beek in Limburg, Netherlands, located  northeast of Maastricht and  northwest of Aachen, Germany. It is the second-largest hub for cargo flights in the Netherlands. As of 2016, the airport had a passenger throughput of 176,000 and handled 60,000 tons of cargo.

The Maastricht Upper Area Control Centre (MUAC) of the European Organisation for the Safety of Air Navigation (EUROCONTROL) is also located at the airport.

History

Pre-World War II
Plans for an airport in southern Limburg date back as far as 1919, with various locations being considered. Years of debate among various municipalities over the location and funding of the airport delayed its construction. In July 1939 the Limburg provincial government agreed to financially back the airport, however, the start of World War II meant the plans were put on hold once more.

Advanced Landing Ground Y-44

After the allied invasion of Normandy, the USAAF Ninth Air Force, specifically the IX Engineer Command, was tasked with constructing temporary airfields close to the advancing front. The area around Maastricht was liberated in 1944. In October 1944, the advance headquarters of the XIX Tactical Air Command and the 84th and 303rd Fighter Wings were moved to Maastricht to keep up with the Ninth Army.

Because of the proximity to the new headquarters, the decision was made to create a temporary airfield between the towns of Beek, Geulle and Ulestraten. Several orchards which had suffered damage from a tank battle were commandeered and cleared. Rubble from the nearby town of Geleen, which had been unintentionally bombed in 1942, was used to level the area.

The field was built in less than 2 months and was operational on 22 March 1945, and was designated Y-44.

The first unit to be based at the field was the 31st Tactical Reconnaissance Squadron, flying the F-6, a reconnaissance version of the P-51 Mustang. The unit arrived on 22 March 1945.

As Nazi Germany was rapidly collapsing, the front was already well into Germany by the time the field was ready, and no direct combat sorties were operated from Y-44. 31st TRS was moved to Y-80 near Wiesbaden on 19 April 1945.

Units operating at the field
31st Tactical Reconnaissance Squadron, F-6 Mustang (22 March 1945 – 19 April 1945 )
39th Photographic Reconnaissance Squadron, F-5 Lightning (2 April 1945 – 20 April 1945)
67th Tactical Reconnaissance Group
155th Photographic Reconnaissance Squadron (Night), F-3 (4 April 1945 – 10 July 1945)
387th Bombardment Group (Medium)
556, 557, 558 and 559th Squadrons, B-26 Marauder (4 May 1945) – 30 May 1945

After World War II
Authority over what was to become known as Beek airfield (vliegveld Beek), was officially transferred to the Dutch government on 1 August 1945. It was decided to keep it open rather than re-open the pre-war debate over the location of an airport in the Maastricht area. The first civilian aircraft landed on 26 September 1945 and were operated by the Regeeringsvliegdienst, a government service with the purpose of carrying government officials and other people with urgent business, because the war had left many roads and railroads heavily damaged. The service used six de Havilland Dragon Rapides made available by the British government.

In 1946, the service was taken over by KLM, using DC-3 Dakotas. However, as repairs to the Dutch infrastructure progressed, demand for the service dropped and it was stopped in 1949. The first semi-permanent airport terminal was completed in 1947. The runway was paved in 1949, and a second paved runway was completed in 1950. In 1951, an agreement between the airport and the Dutch Air Force allowed for rapid expansion of the facilities. Runway 04/22 was lengthened to 1,850 m (6,070 ft), and permanent runway lighting was installed in 1960.

1950s and 1960s
The late 1950s and early 1960s brought significant expansion in commercial operations at the airport. Operators included KLM, Airnautical, Skytours, Euravia, Tradair and Transair. The airport was also used as an intermediate stop for services from London and Manchester to Switzerland, Austria, Italy and Yugoslavia. A local airline based at the airport, Limburg Airways, had a contract with the International Herald Tribune for distributing the newspaper's European edition, which was printed in Paris. Limburg Airways was taken over by Martin's Air Charter (now Martinair) in 1962.

A promotion campaign by the Dutch tourist board for the nearby town of Valkenburg aan de Geul, aimed at British tourists, was highly successful and brought services by Invicta Airlines, Britannia and Channel Airways.

Domestic travel picked up as well, and newly created NLM CityHopper started to operate a service between Maastricht and Amsterdam Schiphol in 1966. The service would continue after KLM acquired NLM in 1992, and would last until 2008. When it was cancelled, it was the last remaining domestic service in the Netherlands.

An ILS system, which allows landings in poor weather, was built in 1967, for runway 22 only.

1970s
In 1973, the airport was expanded again to handle bigger aircraft. The main runway was lengthened to 2500 m (8,200 ft), taxiways were widened, and aprons were enlarged. This mostly offset the negative effects of the 1973 oil crisis, passenger volume remained the same and cargo operations expanded.

The international air traffic control area control centre for EUROCONTROL was built at the airport. It started operations on March 1, 1972.

1980s
Around 1980, the airport changed its name to "Maastricht Airport". In 1983, the aging passenger terminal and air traffic control tower were replaced by new buildings The new terminal was later expanded and is still in use as of 2010.

On 14 May 1985, Pope John Paul II held an open-air mass for 50,000 people at the airport, as part of his visit to the Netherlands.

Plan for an east–west runway
In 1981, a development plan for the airport recommended constructing a 3,500m east–west runway to facilitate growth in cargo operations, particularly during the night hours. The new runway would greatly reduce noise impact over the towns of Beek, Meerssen and the city of Maastricht. Although some night operations are allowed (including distribution of the European edition of The Wall Street Journal), runway length limits intercontinental operations. The Dutch government initially approved plans for the runway in 1985, however, the new runway would mean increased noise over other towns and parts of Belgium as well, and the final decision was delayed. As the new east–west runway would require substantial investment, it would only be profitable if night operations were permitted and increasingly the debate became focused on whether or not night flights should be allowed. Successive cabinets could not reach a final decision, and in 1998, after some 25 years of debate and postponement, the plan was aborted altogether.

1990–2009
In 1992, the Belgian town of Tongeren became shareholder of the airport. Two years later, the board of trade or chamber of commerce of the nearby German city of Aachen became shareholder. This interest eventually became prominent and in October 1994 the airport's name was changed to "Maastricht-Aachen Airport".

In July 2004, a 100% share in the airport was acquired by OmDV, a consortium of airport investment company Omniport and the construction company Dura Vermeer, making it the first fully privatised airport in the Netherlands.

Substantial investments in the airport infrastructure have been made since the privatization. Between August and October 2005, the runway was resurfaced and renamed to 03/21 (from 04/22) to compensate for changes in the earth's magnetic field. The airport originally had two runways; the second (shorter) runway (07/25) was closed and removed to make room for a new cargo terminal and additional aircraft maintenance facilities. Construction of the new facilities started in April 2008.

On 7 May 2005, Air Force One carrying US president George W. Bush landed at the airport. Bush visited the Netherlands American Cemetery in nearby Margraten the next day.

The instrument landing system (ILS) for runway 21 was upgraded to category III in 2008, which allows landings in very low visibility conditions. Amsterdam Airport Schiphol is the only other airport in the Netherlands that has category III ILS.

2010s
In March 2011, the airport was certified to handle the upcoming Boeing 747-8, as two of the airport's major airlines—Cargolux and AirBridge Cargo—have placed orders for this aircraft.

Ryanair announced on July 3, 2012, that Maastricht will become a new Ryanair base from December 2012, the first on Dutch soil, with one Boeing 737-800 being based at the airport and three new routes being launched: Dublin, London-Stansted and Treviso.

In late October 2012, start-up Dutch airline, Maastricht Airlines, announced plans to base six Fokker 50 aircraft at the airport, initially operating to Berlin, Munich, and Amsterdam, before adding Copenhagen, Paris Charles de Gaulle and Southend in 2014. This did not happen and the company declared bankruptcy.

Also in 2013, the airport was helped by the province with a 4.5 million euro contribution. The airport was very close to bankruptcy during this period. Later on, in March 2014, the same province of Limburg believed that closure was never an option. They decided that they would like to take over the airport.

In December 2013, a spokesperson of the airport confirmed the closure of the Ryanair base from March 2014, entailing the ending of the Bergamo, Brive, Dublin, London-Stansted and Málaga flights.

In 2017, Corendon Dutch Airlines announced that they would open a base on the airport with one aircraft based in summer 2018. In late 2018 renovations started on the passenger terminal. Also, freight carriers as Emirates SkyCargo and Saudia Cargo found their way to the airport, while Turkish Airlines Cargo, Silk Way Airlines and Sky Gates Airlines further expanded their operations in Maastricht. Meanwhile, both Corendon Dutch Airlines and Ryanair announced that they would expand their number destinations. Corendon Dutch Airlines even based a second aircraft during the summer season.

Aircraft movements
The number of aircraft movements decreased significantly between 2005 and 2007 compared to previous years due to relocation of a major Dutch flight school, the Nationale Luchtvaartschool, nowadays better known as CAE Oxford Aviation Academy. The flight school, which was originally based at this airport, moved all flight operations to Évora Airport in Portugal. In the summer of 2007, flight training at the airport resumed as the Stella Aviation Academy moved into the facilities previously used by the NLS.

In 2009, there were a total of 40,621 aircraft movements, up 13.9% from 2008. In 2008, there were a total of 35,668 aircraft movements, up 83.4% from 2007. In 2007, there were a total of 19,454 aircraft movements, up 35% from 2006.

Airlines and destinations

Passenger

The following airlines operate regular scheduled and charter flights to and from Maastricht/Aachen:

Cargo

Statistics

Source: Statistics Netherlands

Passenger evolution

Cargo evolution

Other facilities

Jet Center - Maastricht Aachen Airport (MAA) provides handling for general aviation aircraft. Jet Center operates from a hangar situated on the East side of the airport.

Maas Aviation has operated an aircraft painting facility at the airport since the late 1980s. In 2017 it doubled its capacity when it opened a second adjacent paint shop hangar.

The Maastricht Upper Area Control Centre (MUAC) of the European Organisation for the Safety of Air Navigation (EUROCONTROL) is located next to the airport.

Samco Aircraft Maintenance B.V. operates from a hangar on the east side of the airport and supports a wide range of aircraft maintenance activities. Building work on a second adjacent hangar was completed in 2018.

The Aviation Competence Centre (ACC) is a training organization for aircraft mechanics and is located at the airport.

Facilities

Construction of a hotel adjacent to the passenger terminal building started in 2019. The GR8 hotel opened 2021.

Ground transportation

Car
The airport is located along motorway A2, exit 50. Taxis are available at the airport.

Bus
There is bus service (line 30), operated by Arriva, running between Sittard and Maastricht. This line also covers transport between the Maastricht railway station and the airport.

KLM operates a bus connection service to Amsterdam Airport Schiphol. Tickets to use this service are an add-on to a KLM flight ticket.

Bicycle
The airport is situated along the Sittard-Maastricht fast cycling route, which is designed to encourage more people to cycle.

Weather Station

Not far from the airport lies an official weather station of the KNMI (Dutch meteorological institute) 
The weather station was put into use in 1906.

Weather extremes

On 25 July 2019 a temperature of 39.6 °C was recorded.

On 29 June 2021, 87.2mm of precipitation was recorded.

On 25 January 1990 a wind gust of 34 m/s was recorded.

On 14 February 1929 a temperature of -21.4 °C was recorded.

These are the official heat, precipitation, wind & cold records at this weather station.

See also
Advanced Landing Ground

References

Citations

Bibliography

Vleugels, M (1987). Maastricht Airport 1919-1947-1987, De Limburger.

External links

 Official website
 
 

Airfields of the United States Army Air Forces in the Netherlands
Airports established in 1945
Airports in Limburg (Netherlands)
South Limburg (Netherlands)
Transport in Maastricht
Aachen
Beek
1945 establishments in the Netherlands
International airports in the Netherlands
20th-century architecture in the Netherlands